Wayne Martin Messam (born June 7, 1974) is a former American football wide receiver, businessman, and politician serving as the mayor of Miramar, Florida, a position he has held since 2015. A member of the Democratic Party, he was first elected to the Miramar City Commission in 2011 before defeating incumbent mayor Lori Cohen Moseley in the 2015 election. Messam is also a general contractor and owner of a construction firm.

Messam ran for the Democratic nomination for President of the United States in the 2020 United States presidential election. He officially launched his campaign on March 28, 2019. He suspended his presidential campaign on November 20, 2019, having failed to qualify for any of the Democratic debates.

Early life, education, and football
Messam was born in South Bay, FL  to Delsey and Hubert, who were born in Jamaica, where his father was a contractor for cutting sugarcane before they immigrated.

After graduating from Glades Central High School in Belle Glade, FL, Messam attended Florida State University, where he played as a wide receiver for the Florida State Seminoles from 1993 through 1996. He was a member of the 1993 national championship team and caught 62 passes for 793 yards and four touchdowns during his college football career as a Seminole. He graduated from Florida State in 1997 with a bachelor's degree in Management Information Systems.

After not being selected in the 1997 NFL Draft, Messam signed with the Cincinnati Bengals as an undrafted free agent  and was released on August 4 of that year.

Career
Messam started a construction company in 2007. He was first elected to the City Commission of Miramar, Florida in 2011, and was elected as the city's mayor in 2015, defeating incumbent Lori Cohen Moseley and former vice mayor Alexandra Davis with 38.5% of the vote after vacating his commission seat. He won re-election on March 12, 2019.

Messam serves as president of the National Black Caucus of Local Elected Officials.

2020 presidential campaign
In early 2019, some sources indicated that he was considering a bid for the Democratic presidential nomination in 2020, which he neither confirmed nor denied, stating that "all options will remain on the table." On March 13, 2019, he announced the formation of an exploratory committee for a potential run and formally announced his candidacy nine days later.

His campaign received $43,531 in campaign donations in the first quarter of 2019. In April, he was accused of failing to pay his staff. On June 28, he told Fortune Magazine that lack of money had kept his campaign from receiving national attention.

Messam's third quarter fundraising report initially declared that he had received only $5 in income, and had spent $0. Messam claimed that the low amounts were attributable to a "computer glitch." Messam later corrected these amounts to state that he had received $15,312 in income and spent $10,678 during the third quarter. His year-end quarterly reports showed that between the beginning of the fourth quarter and the end of his campaign, Messam received no money in contributions.

Messam suspended his presidential campaign on November 20, 2019. He did not qualify for any Democratic debate and was not classified as a "major candidate" by outlets such as FiveThirtyEight.

Electoral history

References

External links
 Presidential campaign website
 Official site at City of Miramar
 

1974 births
Living people
20th-century African-American people
21st-century African-American politicians
21st-century American businesspeople
21st-century American politicians
African-American mayors in Florida
African-American candidates for President of the United States
American athlete-politicians
American politicians of Jamaican descent
Businesspeople from Florida
Candidates in the 2020 United States presidential election
Cincinnati Bengals players
Florida Democrats
Florida State Seminoles football players
Florida State University alumni
Mayors of places in Florida
People from Palm Beach County, Florida
Players of American football from Florida
Sportspeople from the Miami metropolitan area